Mount Lycabettus, also known as Lycabettos, Lykabettos or Lykavittos, is a Cretaceous limestone hill in the Greek capital Athens. At 277 meters (908 feet) above sea level, its summit is the highest point in Central Athens and pine trees cover its base. The name also refers to the residential neighbourhood immediately below the east of the hill.

The hill is a tourist destination and can be ascended by the Lycabettus Funicular, a funicular railway which climbs the hill from a lower terminus at Kolonaki (The railway station can be found at Aristippou street). At its two peaks are the 19th century Chapel of St. George, a theatre, and a restaurant.

Mythical and legendary stories
Lycabettus appears in various legends. Popular stories suggest it was once the refuge of wolves, (lycos in Greek), which is possibly the origin of its name (means "the one [the hill] that is walked by wolves"). Another etymology suggests a Pelasgian, pre-Mycenean, origin (Lucabetu=mastoid hill).

Mythologically, Lycabettus is credited to Athena, who created it when she dropped a limestone mountain she had been carrying from the Pallene peninsula for the construction of the Acropolis after the box holding Erichthonius was opened.

Theatre

The hill has a large open-air amphitheatre at the top, which has housed many Greek and international concerts. Since 2008 it is closed due to safety concerns. By 2022 the city of Athens suggested the renovation and reopening of the theatre. Among the artists who have performed at the Lycabettus theatre are Ray Charles, Joan Baez, B.B. King, Chuck Berry, Jerry Lee Lewis, Leonard Cohen, James Brown, Bob Dylan, Paco De Lucia, Al Di Meola, John Mc Laughlin, Gary Moore, Peter Gabriel, Black Sabbath, Nick Cave, Bjork, Dead Can Dance, Pet Shop Boys, Deep Purple, UB40, Placebo, Morrissey, Radiohead, Moby, Massive Attack, Faith No More, Faithless, Whitesnake, Tracy Chapman, Nightwish, Slipknot, Patti Smith, Vanessa Mae, Bryan Ferry, Tito Puente, Buena Vista Social Club, Orishas, The Prodigy, Iron Maiden, Nazareth, Blackmore's Night and Scorpions.

Gallery

See also
List of contemporary amphitheatres

References

 Boguslawski, Alexander (2000). "Lykavittos Hill." Retrieved August 30, 2005.

External links
Lycabettus Hill Website
 
High-resolution 360° Panorama of Mount Lycabettus | Art Atlas

Lycabettus
Outdoor theatres
Tourist attractions in Athens
Neighbourhoods in Athens
Pelasgian words